The 2017 Howard Bison football team represented Howard University in the 2017 NCAA Division I FCS football season. They were led by first-year head coach Mike London. The Bison played their home games at William H. Greene Stadium. They were a member of the Mid-Eastern Athletic Conference (MEAC).

The Bison kicked off the season by defeating UNLV, a 45-point favorite, in the biggest upset in college football history by point spread. They would finish the season 7–4, 6–2 in MEAC play to finish in a tie for second place.

Previous season

The Bison started 2016 play with a Big Ten doubleheader: they opened the season at Maryland, losing by nearly 40, and then traveled to Rutgers, only to lose by 38. They recorded two more losses, against Hampton and Morgan State before notching their first win at Norfolk State. Five more losses then followed, and the Bison finished a dismal season with a win against last-place Delaware State. They finished tenth out of eleven in the MEAC.

Before the season

Recruiting

On National Signing Day, Howard signed 23 athletes out of high school for their 2017 recruiting class.

Coaching staff

Schedule

 Source: Schedule

Roster

Game summaries

at UNLV

 

The Bison opened their 2017 season on the road against Football Bowl Subdivision (FBS) opponent UNLV in Whitney, NV. Despite being a 45-point underdog to the Rebels, the Bison were able to leave Las Vegas with their first win over a Division I FBS opponent in the program's history. Following the win, media outlets immediately hailed it as the greatest upset in college football history against the spread.

In his collegiate debut, freshman quarterback Caylin Newton completed 15 of 26 passes for a total 190 yards; he threw 1 touchdown, a 1-yard pass in the 2nd quarter, and 1 interception. Newton was also able to display his abilities on the ground by leading in rushing yards with 21 carries, 190 yards and 2 touchdowns. Senior running back Anthony Phillyaw ran for 71 yards on s completions for 2 touchdowns. Phillyaw was also the top receiver with 3 receptions, 62 yards, 20.7 yards per reception.

at Kent State

After their first win over an FBS team in program history, the Bison were looking to make lightning strike two weeks in a row with a win over Kent State. Kent State's fourth quarter rally, and an interception by Kent State's Demetrius Monday gave the Golden Flashes the win. The Bison recorded 432 yards of total offense, including 226 yards passing and 206 yards Rushing. Quarterback Caliyn Newton threw 9 for 22 completions with a total 225 yards passing including 1 touchdown, and 1 interception. Other standout performers include: Running Back Anthony Philyaw who ran for 147 yards rushing on 20 carries, including 1 touchdown and receiver Jequez Ezzard who recorded 120 yards.

Ranking movements

References

Howard
Howard Bison football seasons
Howard Bison football